Ermirio Pereira de Moraes Neto (born 1932/1933) is a Brazilian billionaire businessman, co-owner of the privately held Votorantim Group.

Early life
Ermirio Pereira de Moraes is one of two children of the late Antônio Ermírio de Moraes. Moraes earned a bachelor's degree in petroleum engineering from the University of Tulsa in Tulsa, Oklahoma.

Career
Following the death of his father in 2014, he and his sister inherited control of Votorantim Group, one of Brazil's largest privately held companies.

According to Forbes, he has an estimated net worth of $3.2 billion in December 2014.

Personal life
He is married with seven children.

References

1930s births
Living people
Businesspeople from São Paulo
Brazilian businesspeople
Brazilian billionaires
University of Tulsa alumni